Cirsium pumilum, the pasture thistle, is a North American species of plants in the tribe Cardueae within the family Asteraceae.  The species is native to the northeastern and north-central United States as well as to the Canadian Province of Ontario.

Cirsium pumilum is a biennial or perennial herb up to 100 cm (40 inches) tall, blooming once before dying. It has leaf blades up to 30 cm (12 inches) long, with slender to stout spines. There are usually a few flower heads, sweetly scented, with pink, purple or white disc florets but no ray florets.

Varieties
 Cirsium pumilum var. hillii (Canby) B. Boivin - Great Lakes region, upper Mississippi Valley
 Cirsium pumilum var. pumilum - northeastern + east-central United States from Maine to South Carolina west to Ohio

References

External links

pumilum
Flora of the Eastern United States
Flora of Ontario
Plants described in 1818
Flora without expected TNC conservation status